The 3rd Kazakhstan President Cup was played from April 28 to May 1, 2010, in Astana. Eight youth teams participated in the tournament (players were born no earlier than 1994.)

Participants

Venues 
All games took place in «Astana Arena».

Format 
The tournament is held in two stages. In the first stage, eight teams are divided into two qualification groups (A and B). Competitions of the first stage followed a round-robin system. The winners of the groups advance to the final, while the group runners-up meet to determine third place.

Group stage 
All times UTC+6

Group A

Group B

Match for the 7th place

Match for the 5th place

Bronze medal match

Final

Statistics

Awards 
 Goalscorer of a tournament
 Nikola Ninkovic (Serbia;8 goals)
 The best goalkeeper of a tournament
 Danil Kovalev (CSKA)
 The best defender of a tournament
 Rinat Khairullin (Tsesna)
 The best midfielder of a tournament
 Igor Elin (Zenit)
 Prize of spectator sympathies
 Erzhet Erzatuly (Xinjiang Sport Lottery)

Prize money 
According to FFK, the prize fund of a tournament will make 20,000 $. The teams who took first, second, and third place will receive 10,000, 6,000, and 4,000 $, respectively.

2010
2010 in Kazakhstani football
2009–10 in European football
2010 in Asian football
2010 in youth association football